Nepali is the national language of Nepal. Besides being spoken as a mother tongue by more than 48% of the population of Nepal, it is also spoken in Bhutan and India. The language is recognized in the Nepali constitution as an official language of Nepal.

The variety presented here is standard Nepali as spoken in Nepal. There are three major dialects: eastern, central, and western. Though many dialects can be distinguished in Nepal and other South Asian countries, there is reported to be little variation in phonology from one to another.

Vowels
Nepali has 11 phonologically distinctive vowels, including 6 oral vowels and 5 nasal vowels (indicated in the IPA with tildes ~).

As the above list shows, there are five nasal vowels. The high mid back vowel  does not have a nasal counterpart at the phonological level; although the vowel  does exist phonetically in the language, it is often in free variation with its oral counterpart, as in  ~  'short',  ~  'sheep'. Nasal vowels are not frequent in the Nepali lexicon, compared to French in which the number of lexicon with nasal vowels is large. They occur mostly in verbs.

They state that minimal pairs are easily obtainable only for the vowel . Examples are shown below:

  'inside corner',  'tremble!' (2nd p. sg. imperative)
  ('shelter'),  ('bamboo')
  ('rent'),   ('pots')
  ('be heated!'),  ('row')
  ('pressure'),  ('magnolia wood')

At the phonetic level, oral vowels can be nasalized when following a nasal consonant.

Diphthongs
 followed two diphthongs first elaborated by Shivaraja Acharya in वर्णोच्चारण शिक्षा in 1974.

The following rules can be followed to figure out whether or not Nepali words retain the final schwa.

1) Schwa is retained if the final syllable is a conjunct consonant.

2) For any verb form the final schwa is always retained unless the schwa-cancelling halanta is present.  ('it happens'),  ('in happening so; therefore'), ('he apparently went'), but  ('they are'),  ('she went').

Meanings may change with the wrong orthography:  ('she didn't go') vs  ('she went').

3) Adverbs, onomatopoeia and postpositions usually maintain the schwa and if they don't, halanta is acquired:  ( 'now'),  ('towards'),  ('today')  ( 'drizzle') vs  ('more').

4) Few exceptional nouns retain the schwa such as: ('suffering'),  ('pleasure').

Note: Schwas are often retained in music and poetry to facilitate singing and recitation.

Consonants
Spoken Nepali has 30 consonants in its native system though some have tried to limit the number to 27.

The combination of the labio-velar approximant /w/ and /e, i, o, ʌi̯, r, w, j/ is constrained in Nepali, thus the orthographic ⟨व⟩ is always pronounced as a bilabial stop /b/ in such cases, but only sometimes otherwise. All consonants except  have geminates between vowels.

The murmured stops may lose their breathy-voice between vowels and word-finally. Non-geminate aspirated and murmured stops may also become fricatives, with /pʰ/ as [], /bʱ/ as [], /kʰ/ as [], and /ɡʱ/ as []. Examples of this are  'clean' becoming  and  'before' becoming ).

 are flapped in postvocalic position.  is usually a trill [] but may be a tap [] in intervocalic position.

Typically, sounds transcribed with the retroflex symbols  are not purely retroflex  but apical postalveolar .

Debated consonants
Mostly words from Sanskrit have consonants that are not very common in inventory of the spoken language, occurring in borrowed words where they are prescriptively pronounced as described in Sanskrit grammars. It is flapped  in spelling pronunciations of some loanwords in Sanskrit.

Phonotactics

Syllable structure
Syllables may be structured as (C1)(C2)(C3)V(C4).

Nepali syllable structure consists of an optional syllable onset, consisting up to three consonants; an obligatory syllable nucleus, consisting of a vowel; and an optional syllable coda, consisting of one consonant. The following restrictions apply:
 Onset
 First consonant (C1): Can be any consonant.
 Second consonant (C2): Can be any consonant.
 Third consonant (C3): Can only be liquids ( and ) and semivowels ( and ).
 Nucleus
 Vowel (V)
 Coda
 Consonant (C4): Can be any consonant.

Final Cluster
Additional consonant(C5) in coda occurs in loanwords and in handful of native words such as /ɡʌnd͡z/ and /mʌnt͡s/.

References

Bibliography

 
 
 
 
 
 
 
 
 
 

Languages of Nepal
Indo-Aryan phonologies